Wilhelm Hermann Conrad Enno Rösingh (2 December 1900 – 5 June 1976) was a Dutch rower who competed in the 1924 Summer Olympics. Rösingh was born in Amsterdam in 1900. In 1924 he won the gold medal with his partner Teun Beijnen in the coxless pair event. He died in Amsterdam on 5 June 1976.

References

External links
 profile

1900 births
1976 deaths
Dutch male rowers
Olympic rowers of the Netherlands
Rowers at the 1924 Summer Olympics
Olympic gold medalists for the Netherlands
Rowers from Amsterdam
Olympic medalists in rowing
Medalists at the 1924 Summer Olympics
European Rowing Championships medalists
20th-century Dutch people